Eudonia singulannulata is a moth in the family Crambidae. It was described by Wei-Chun Li, Hou-Hun Li and Matthias Nuss in 2012. It is found in China (Henan, Ningxia, Shaanxi, Sichuan, Xinjiang).

The length of the forewings is 8–10 mm. The forewings are covered with dense blackish-brown scales. The antemedian line is white and the antemedian stigmata is blackish brown. The postmedian and subterminal lines are white and the terminal spots are black, distinct. The termen is dark brown. The hindwings are greyish white to pale brown.

Etymology
The species name refers to the ductus bursae, which is looped once in the female genitalia and is derived from Latin singul (meaning single) and annulatus (meaning annulose).

References

Moths described in 2012
Eudonia